The 2013 Black Reel Awards, which annually recognize and celebrate the achievements of black people in feature, independent and television films, took place in Harlem, New York on February 7, 2013. Middle of Nowhere lead the pack with 9 nominations and Steel Magnolias lead the television nominees with 7.  Over 25 categories were announced this year. Previously retired categories that returned included: Outstanding Voice Performance, Outstanding Supporting Actor & Actress in a TV Movie, Outstanding Directing & Writing in a TV Movie/Mini-Series. Whitney Houston earned a posthumous nomination in the Outstanding Song category for her duet with Jordin Sparks in the film Sparkle.

Beasts of the Southern Wild was the big winner in the motion picture category taking home four awards including Outstanding Picture and Actress (Quvenzhané Wallis). Django Unchained came a close second with three wins including one for Outstanding Supporting Actor (Samuel L. Jackson). Abducted: The Carlina White Story was the biggest winner in the television category with four wins. In a surprise win, TV One's A Beautiful Soul pulled in upset win for Outstanding Television Movie over heavily nominated TV movies Steel Magnolias and Raising Izzie.

Quvenzhané Wallis and Ava DuVernay were multiple winners each winning two awards.

Winners and nominees
Winners are listed first and highlighted in bold.

{| class=wikitable width="100%"
! width="50%"|  Best Film
! width="50%"| Best Director
|-
| valign="top" |
 Beasts of the Southern Wild
 Django Unchained
 Flight
 The Intouchables
 Middle of Nowhere
| valign="top" |
 Ava DuVernay – Middle of Nowhere
 Salim Akil – Sparkle
 Spike Lee – Red Hook Summer
 Peter Ramsey – Rise of the Guardians
 Tim Story – Think Like a Man
|-
! width="50%"| Best Actor
! width="50%"| Best Actress
|-
| valign="top" |
 Denzel Washington – Flight Jamie Foxx – Django Unchained
 Nate Parker – Red Tails
 Chris Rock – 2 Days in New York
 Omar Sy – The Intouchables
| valign="top" |
 Quvenzhané Wallis – Beasts of the Southern Wild Halle Berry – Cloud Atlas
 Emayatzy Corinealdi – Middle of Nowhere
 Viola Davis – Won't Back Down
 Rashida Jones – Celeste and Jesse Forever
|-
! width="50%"| Best Supporting Actor
! width="50%"| Best Supporting Actress
|-
| valign="top" |
 Samuel L. Jackson – Django Unchained Mike Epps – Sparkle
 Dwight Henry – Beasts of the Southern Wild
 David Oyelowo – Middle of Nowhere
 Nate Parker – Arbitrage
| valign="top" |
 Naomie Harris – Skyfall Octavia Spencer – Smashed
 Tamara Tunie – Flight
 Lorraine Toussaint – Middle of Nowhere
 Kerry Washington – Django Unchained
|-
! width="50%"| Best Breakthrough Performance
! width="50%"| Best Ensemble 
|-
| valign="top" |
 Quvenzhané Wallis – Beasts of the Southern Wild Emayatzy Corinealdi – Middle of Nowhere
 Dwight Henry – Beasts of the Southern Wild
 Amandla Stenberg – The Hunger Games
 Omar Sy – The Intouchables
| valign="top" |
 Victoria Thomas – Django Unchained Victoria Burrows – Flight
 Tracy Byrd – Sparkle
 Aisha Coley – Middle of Nowhere
 Kimberly Hardin – Think Like a Man
|-
! width="100%" colspan="2"| Best Original or Adapted Song
|- 
| colspan="2" valign="top" |
 "Who Did That to You?" from Django Unchained – Performed by John Legend "Carry It" from The Man with the Iron Fists – Performed by Travis Barker, RZA, Tom Morello and Raekwon
 "Celebrate" from Sparkle – Performed by Jordin Sparks and Whitney Houston
 "No Church in the Wild" from Safe House – Performed by Jay Z, Kanye West and Frank Ocean
 "Tonight (Best You Ever Had)" from Think Like a Man – Performed by John Legend and Ludacris
|-
! width="50%"| Outstanding Original Score
! width="50%"| Best Voice Performance
|-
| valign="top" |
 Dan Romer and Benh Zeitlin – Beasts of the Southern Wild Terence Blanchard – Red Tails
 Kathryn Bostic – Middle of Nowhere
 Bruce Hornsby – Red Hook Summer
 Salaam Remi – Sparkle
| valign="top" |
 Dennis Haysbert – Wreck-It Ralph Tempestt Bledsoe – ParaNorman
 Queen Latifah – Ice Age: Continental Drift
 Chris Rock – Madagascar 3: Europe's Most Wanted
 Wanda Sykes – Ice Age: Continental Drift
|-
! width="50%"| Best Screenplay, Adapted or Original
! width="50%"| Best Independent Short
|-
| valign="top" |
 Ava DuVernay – Middle of Nowhere Mara Brock Akil – Sparkle
 Rashida Jones and Will McCormack – Celeste and Jesse Forever
 Spike Lee and James McBride – Red Hook Summer
 Aaron McGruder and John Ridley – Red Tails
| valign="top" |
 The Bluest Note – Maruqes Green Crossover – Tina Mabry
 Last/First Kiss – Andrea Ashton
 Record/Play – Jesse Atlas
 White Space – Maya Washington
|-
! width="50%"| Best Feature Documentary
! width="50%"| Best Independent Documentary
|-
| valign="top" |
 The Central Park Five – Ken Burns, Sarah Burns and David McMahon Bad 25 – Spike Lee
 Brooklyn Castle – Katie Dallamaggiore
 Marley – Kevin MacDonald
 Searching for Sugar Man – Malik Bendjelloul
| valign="top" |
 Soul Food Junkies – Byron Hurt BMF: The Rise and Fall of Hip-Hop Drug Empire – Dan Sikorski
 Contradictions of Fair Hope – S. Epatha Merkerson and Rockell Metcalf
 From Fatherless to Fatherhood – Kobie Brown
 Justice for Sale – Femeke and Isla van Velzen
|-
! width="50%"| Best Independent Feature
! width="50%"| Best Foreign Film
|-
| valign="top" |
 LUV – Sheldon Candis Elza – Mariette Monpierre
 Four – Joshua Sanchez
 The Last Fall – Matthew A. Cherry
 Yelling to the Sky – Victoria Mahoney
| valign="top" |
 The Intouchables (France) – Olivier Nakache & Éric Toledano Elza (France) – Mariette Monpierre
 Ties That Bind (Ghana) – Leila Djansi
 Toussaint Louverture (France) – Philippe Niang
 Wuthering Heights (U.K.) – Andrea Arnold
|-
! width="50%"| Best Television Documentary or Special
! width="50%"| Best Television Miniseries or Movie
|- 
| valign="top" |
 Nelson George and Diane Paragas – Brooklyn Boheme (Showtime) Mark Ford – Uprising: Hip-Hop and the LA Riots (VH1)
 Nelson George – The Announcement (ESPN)
 Deobrah Morales – On the Shoulders of Giants (Showtime)
 Samuel D. Pollard – Slavery by Another Name (PBS)
| valign="top" |
 A Beautiful Soul (TV One) – Holly Carter and Dominique Telson Let It Shine (Disney Channel) – Amy Gibbons and Paul Hoen
 Raising Izzie (UP) – Angelique Bones
 Somebody's Child (UP) – David Eubanks, Keith Neal and Eric Tomosunas
 Steel Magnolias (Lifetime) – Neil Meron and Craig Zadan
|-
! width="50%"| Best Actor in a TV Movie or Limited Series
! width="50%"| Best Actress in a TV Movie or Limited Series
|-
| valign="top" |
 Sean Patrick Thomas – Murder on the 13th Floor (Lifetime) Rockmond Dunbar – Raising Izzie (UP)
 Cuba Gooding Jr. – Firelight (ABC)
 Trevor Jackson – Let It Shine (Disney Channel)
 Michael Jai White – Somebody's Child (UP)
| valign="top" |
 Aunjanue Ellis – Abducted: The Carlina White Story (Lifetime) Queen Latifah – Steel Magnolias (Lifetime)
 Keke Palmer – Abducted: The Carlina White Story (Lifetime)
 Lynn Whitfield – Somebody's Child (UP)
 Vanessa A. Williams – Raising Izzie (UP)
|-
! width="50%"| Best Supporting Actor in a TV Movie or Limited Series
! width="50%"| Best Supporting Actress in a TV Movie or Limited Series
|-
| valign="top" |
 Courtney B. Vance – Let It Shine (Disney Channel) Danny Glover – Hannah's Law (Hallmark)
 Louis Gossett Jr. – Smitty (UP)
 Boris Kodjoe – A Killer Amongst Us (Lifetime)
 Harry Lennix – A Beautiful Soul (TV One)
| valign="top" |
 Alfre Woodard – Steel Magnolias (Lifetime) Adepero Oduye – Steel Magnolias (Lifetime)
 Phylicia Rashad – Steel Magnolias (Lifetime)
 Gloria Reuben – Jesse Stone: Benefit of the Doubt (CBS)
 Jill Scott – Steel Magnolias (Lifetime)
|-
! width="50%"| Outstanding Director in a Television Miniseries or Movie
! width="50%"| Outstanding Screenplay in a TV Movie or Limited Series
|-
| valign="top" |
 Vondie Curtis-Hall – Abducted: The Carlina White Story (Lifetime) Roger M. Bobb – Raising Izzie (UP)
 Kenny Leon – Steel Magnolias (Lifetime)
 Darnell Martin – Firelight (ABC)
 Bille Woodruff – Rags (Nickelodeon)
| valign="top" |
 Elizabeth Hunter – Abducted: The Carlina White Story (Lifetime)' Eric Daniel – Let It Shine (Disney Channel)
 David Martyn Conley – Raising Izzie (UP)
 Siddeeqah Powell – Somebody's Child (UP)
 Cas Sigers – A Cross to Bear (UP)
|}

Highlights
 Beasts of the Southern Wild became the big winner with 4 wins. Abducted: The Carlina White Story and Django Unchained'' took home 3 awards.
 Ava DuVernay became the second woman to win in the Best Director category. Gina Prince-Bythewood became the first.
 John Legend, Vondie Curtis-Hall and Alfre Woodard became the first multiple winners in their respective categories (Best Song/Best Director: TV Movie/ Best Supporting Actress: TV Movie).
 Quvenzhané Wallis continued her history making film career in becoming the youngest Best Actress and Breakthrough winner ever.
 Denzel Washington continues his winning streak in the Best Actor category with four Best Actor wins.
 Earning their first Black Reel Award were: Paul Epworth, Behn Zeitlin, Ava DuVernay, Quvenzhané Wallis, Aunjanue Ellis, Sean Patrick Thomas, Elizabeth Hunter, Dan Romer, Samuel L. Jackson, Victoria Thomas, Courtney B. Vance, Nelson George, Sarah Burns, Ken Burns, Diane Gargas and Sheldon Candis,

References

2013 in American cinema
2013 awards in the United States
Black Reel Awards
2012 film awards